Brewing is the production of beer by steeping a starch source (commonly cereal grains, the most popular of which is barley) in water and fermenting the resulting sweet liquid with yeast.  It may be done in a brewery by a commercial brewer, at home by a homebrewer, or communally. Brewing has taken place since around the 6th millennium BC, and archaeological evidence suggests that emerging civilizations, including ancient Egypt and Mesopotamia, brewed beer. Since the nineteenth century the brewing industry has been part of most western economies.

The basic ingredients of beer are water and a fermentable starch source such as malted barley. Most beer is fermented with a brewer's yeast and flavoured with hops. Less widely used starch sources include millet, sorghum and cassava. Secondary sources (adjuncts), such as maize (corn), rice, or sugar, may also be used, sometimes to reduce cost, or to add a feature, such as adding wheat to aid in retaining the foamy head of the beer. The most common starch source is ground cereal or "grist" - the proportion of the starch or cereal ingredients in a beer recipe may be called grist, grain bill, or simply mash ingredients.

Steps in the brewing process include malting, milling, mashing, lautering, boiling, fermenting, conditioning, filtering, and packaging. There are three main fermentation methods: warm, cool and spontaneous. Fermentation may take place in an open or closed fermenting vessel; a secondary fermentation may also occur in the cask or bottle. There are several additional brewing methods, such as Burtonisation, double dropping, and Yorkshire Square, as well as post-fermentation treatment such as filtering, and barrel-ageing.

History

Brewing has taken place since around the 6th millennium BC, and archaeological evidence suggests emerging civilizations including ancient Egypt and Mesopotamia brewed beer. Descriptions of various beer recipes can be found in cuneiform (the oldest known writing) from ancient Mesopotamia. In Mesopotamia the brewer's craft was the only profession which derived social sanction and divine protection from female deities/goddesses, specifically: Ninkasi, who covered the production of beer, Siris, who was used in a metonymic way to refer to beer, and Siduri, who covered the enjoyment of beer. In pre-industrial times, and in developing countries, women are frequently the main brewers.

As almost any cereal containing certain sugars can undergo spontaneous fermentation due to wild yeasts in the air, it is possible that beer-like beverages were independently developed throughout the world soon after a tribe or culture had domesticated cereal. Chemical tests of ancient pottery jars reveal that beer was produced as far back as about 7,000 years ago in what is today Iran. This discovery reveals one of the earliest known uses of fermentation and is the earliest evidence of brewing to date. In Mesopotamia, the oldest evidence of beer is believed to be a 6,000-year-old Sumerian tablet depicting people drinking a beverage through reed straws from a communal bowl. A 3900-year-old Sumerian poem honouring Ninkasi, the patron goddess of brewing, contains the oldest surviving beer recipe, describing the production of beer from barley via bread. The invention of bread and beer has been argued to be responsible for humanity's ability to develop technology and build civilization. The earliest chemically confirmed barley beer to date was discovered at Godin Tepe in the central Zagros Mountains of Iran, where fragments of a jug, at least 5,000 years old was found to be coated with beerstone, a by-product of the brewing process. Beer may have been known in Neolithic Europe as far back as 5,000 years ago, and was mainly brewed on a domestic scale.

Ale produced before the Industrial Revolution continued to be made and sold on a domestic scale, although by the 7th century AD beer was also being produced and sold by European monasteries. During the Industrial Revolution, the production of beer moved from artisanal manufacture to industrial manufacture, and domestic manufacture ceased to be significant by the end of the 19th century. The development of hydrometers and thermometers changed brewing by allowing the brewer more control of the process, and greater knowledge of the results. Today, the brewing industry is a global business, consisting of several dominant multinational companies and many thousands of smaller producers ranging from brewpubs to regional breweries. More than 133 billion litres (35 billion gallons) are sold per year—producing total global revenues of $294.5 billion (£147.7 billion) in 2006.

Ingredients

The basic ingredients of beer are water; a starch source, such as malted barley, able to be fermented (converted into alcohol); a brewer's yeast to produce the fermentation; and a flavouring, such as hops, to offset the sweetness of the malt. A mixture of starch sources may be used, with a secondary saccharide, such as maize (corn), rice, or sugar, these often being termed adjuncts, especially when used as a lower-cost substitute for malted barley. Less widely used starch sources include millet, sorghum, and cassava root in Africa, potato in Brazil, and agave in Mexico, among others. The most common starch source is ground cereal or "grist" - the proportion of the starch or cereal ingredients in a beer recipe may be called grist, grain bill, or simply mash ingredients.

Water
Beer is composed mostly of water. Regions have water with different mineral components; as a result, different regions were originally better suited to making certain types of beer, thus giving them a regional character. For example, Dublin has hard water well suited to making stout, such as Guinness; while Pilsen has soft water well suited to making pale lager, such as Pilsner Urquell. The waters of Burton in England contain gypsum, which benefits making pale ale to such a degree that brewers of pale ales will add gypsum to the local water in a process known as Burtonisation.

Starch source

The starch source in a beer provides the fermentable material and is a key determinant of the strength and flavour of the beer. The most common starch source used in beer is malted grain. Grain is malted by soaking it in water, allowing it to begin germination, and then drying the partially germinated grain in a kiln. Malting grain produces enzymes that will allow conversion from starches in the grain into fermentable sugars during the mash process. Different roasting times and temperatures are used to produce different colours of malt from the same grain. Darker malts will produce darker beers.

Nearly all beer includes barley malt as the majority of the starch. This is because of its fibrous husk, which is important not only in the sparging stage of brewing (in which water is washed over the mashed barley grains to form the wort) but also as a rich source of amylase, a digestive enzyme that facilitates conversion of starch into sugars. Other malted and unmalted grains (including wheat, rice, oats, and rye, and, less frequently, maize (corn) and sorghum) may be used. In recent years, a few brewers have produced gluten-free beer made with sorghum with no barley malt for people who cannot digest gluten-containing grains like wheat, barley, and rye.

Hops

Hops are the female flower clusters or seed cones of the hop vine Humulus lupulus, which are used as a flavouring and preservative agent in nearly all beer made today. Hops had been used for medicinal and food flavouring purposes since Roman times; by the 7th century in Carolingian monasteries in what is now Germany, beer was being made with hops, though it isn't until the thirteenth century that widespread cultivation of hops for use in beer is recorded. Before the thirteenth century, beer was flavoured with plants such as yarrow, wild rosemary, and bog myrtle, and other ingredients such as juniper berries, aniseed and ginger, which would be combined into a mixture known as gruit and used as hops are now used; between the thirteenth and the sixteenth century, during which hops took over as the dominant flavouring, beer flavoured with gruit was known as ale, while beer flavoured with hops was known as beer. Some beers today, such as Fraoch by the Scottish Heather Ales company and Cervoise Lancelot by the French Brasserie-Lancelot company, use plants other than hops for flavouring.

Hops contain several characteristics that brewers desire in beer: they contribute a bitterness that balances the sweetness of the malt; they provide floral, citrus, and herbal aromas and flavours; they have an antibiotic effect that favours the activity of brewer's yeast over less desirable microorganisms; and they aid in "head retention", the length of time that the foam on top of the beer (the beer head) will last. The preservative in hops comes from the lupulin glands which contain soft resins with alpha and beta acids. Though much studied, the preservative nature of the soft resins is not yet fully understood, though it has been observed that unless stored at a cool temperature, the preservative nature will decrease. Brewing is the sole major commercial use of hops.

Yeast

Yeast is the microorganism that is responsible for fermentation in beer. Yeast metabolises the sugars extracted from grains, which produces alcohol and carbon dioxide, and thereby turns wort into beer. In addition to fermenting the beer, yeast influences the character and flavour.
The dominant types of yeast used to make beer are Saccharomyces cerevisiae, known as ale yeast, and Saccharomyces pastorianus, known as lager yeast;  Brettanomyces ferments lambics, and Torulaspora delbrueckii ferments Bavarian weissbier. Before the role of yeast in fermentation was understood, fermentation involved wild or airborne yeasts, and a few styles such as lambics still use this method today. Emil Christian Hansen, a Danish biochemist employed by the Carlsberg Laboratory, developed pure yeast cultures which were introduced into the Carlsberg brewery in 1883, and pure yeast strains are now the main fermenting source used worldwide.

Clarifying agent

Some brewers add one or more clarifying agents to beer, which typically precipitate (collect as a solid) out of the beer along with protein solids and are found only in trace amounts in the finished product. This process makes the beer appear bright and clean, rather than the cloudy appearance of ethnic and older styles of beer such as wheat beers.

Examples of clarifying agents include isinglass, obtained from swim bladders of fish; Irish moss, a seaweed; kappa carrageenan, from the seaweed kappaphycus; polyclar (a commercial brand of clarifier); and gelatin. If a beer is marked "suitable for Vegans", it was generally clarified either with seaweed or with artificial agents, although the "Fast Cask" method invented by Marston's in 2009 may provide another method.

Brewing process

There are several steps in the brewing process, which may include malting, mashing, lautering, boiling, fermenting, conditioning, filtering, and packaging. The brewing equipment needed to make beer has grown more sophisticated over time, and now covers most aspects of the brewing process.

Malting is the process where barley grain is made ready for brewing. Malting is broken down into three steps in order to help to release the starches in the barley. First, during steeping, the grain is added to a vat with water and allowed to soak for approximately 40 hours. During germination, the grain is spread out on the floor of the germination room for around 5 days. The final part of malting is kilning when the malt goes through a very high temperature drying in a kiln; with gradual temperature increase over several hours. When kilning is complete, the grains are now termed malt, and they will be milled or crushed to break apart the kernels and expose the cotyledon, which contains the majority of the carbohydrates and sugars; this makes it easier to extract the sugars during mashing.

Mashing converts the starches released during the malting stage into sugars that can be fermented. The milled grain is mixed with hot water in a large vessel known as a mash tun. In this vessel, the grain and water are mixed together to create a cereal mash. During the mash, naturally occurring enzymes present in the malt convert the starches (long chain carbohydrates) in the grain into smaller molecules or simple sugars (mono-, di-, and tri-saccharides). This "conversion" is called saccharification which occurs between the temperatures . The result of the mashing process is a sugar-rich liquid or "wort", which is then strained through the bottom of the mash tun in a process known as lautering. Additional water may be sprinkled on the grains to extract additional sugars (a process known as sparging).

The wort is moved into a large tank known as a "copper" or kettle where it is boiled with hops and sometimes other ingredients such as herbs or sugars. This stage is where many chemical reactions take place, and where important decisions about the flavour, colour, and aroma of the beer are made. The boiling process serves to terminate enzymatic processes, precipitate proteins, isomerize hop resins, and concentrate and sterilize the wort. Hops add flavour, aroma and bitterness to the beer. At the end of the boil, the hopped wort settles to clarify in a vessel called a "whirlpool", where the more solid particles in the wort are separated out.

After the whirlpool, the wort is drawn away from the compacted hop trub, and rapidly cooled via a heat exchanger to a temperature where yeast can be added. A variety of heat exchanger designs are used in breweries, with the most common a plate-style. Water or glycol run in channels in the opposite direction of the wort, causing a rapid drop in temperature. It is very important to quickly cool the wort to a level where yeast can be added safely as yeast is unable to grow in very high temperatures, and will start to die in temperatures above . After the wort goes through the heat exchanger, the cooled wort goes into a fermentation tank. A type of yeast is selected and added, or "pitched", to the fermentation tank. When the yeast is added to the wort, the fermenting process begins, where the sugars turn into alcohol, carbon dioxide and other components. When the fermentation is complete the brewer may rack the beer into a new tank, called a conditioning tank. Conditioning of the beer is the process in which the beer ages, the flavour becomes smoother, and flavours that are unwanted dissipate. After conditioning for a week to several months, the beer may be filtered and force carbonated for bottling, or fined in the cask.

Mashing

Mashing is the process of combining a mix of milled grain (typically malted barley with supplementary grains such as corn, sorghum, rye or wheat), known as the "grist" or "grain bill", and water, known as "liquor", and heating this mixture in a vessel called a "mash tun". Mashing is a form of steeping, and defines the act of brewing, such as with making tea, sake, and soy sauce. Technically, wine, cider and mead are not brewed but rather vinified, as there is no steeping process involving solids. Mashing allows the enzymes in the malt to break down the starch in the grain into sugars, typically maltose to create a malty liquid called wort. There are two main methods – infusion mashing, in which the grains are heated in one vessel; and decoction mashing, in which a proportion of the grains are boiled and then returned to the mash, raising the temperature. Mashing involves pauses at certain temperatures (notably ), and takes place in a "mash tun" – an insulated brewing vessel with a false bottom. The end product of mashing is called a "mash".

Mashing usually takes 1 to 2 hours, and during this time the various temperature rests activate different enzymes depending upon the type of malt being used, its modification level, and the intention of the brewer. The activity of these enzymes convert the starches of the grains to dextrins and then to fermentable sugars such as maltose. A mash rest from  activates various proteases, which break down proteins that might otherwise cause the beer to be hazy. This rest is generally used only with undermodified (i.e. undermalted) malts which are decreasingly popular in Germany and the Czech Republic, or non-malted grains such as corn and rice, which are widely used in North American beers. A mash rest at  activates β-glucanase, which breaks down gummy β-glucans in the mash, making the sugars flow out more freely later in the process. In the modern mashing process, commercial fungal based β-glucanase may be added as a supplement. Doing the latter rest at the lower end of the range favours β-amylase enzymes, producing more low-order sugars like maltotriose, maltose, and glucose which are more fermentable by the yeast. This in turn creates a beer lower in body and higher in alcohol. A rest closer to the higher end of the range favours α-amylase enzymes, creating more higher-order sugars and dextrins which are less fermentable by the yeast, so a fuller-bodied beer with less alcohol is the result. Duration and pH variances also affect the sugar composition of the resulting wort.

Lautering

Lautering is the separation of the wort (the liquid containing the sugar extracted during mashing) from the grains. This is done either in a mash tun outfitted with a false bottom, in a lauter tun, or in a mash filter. Most separation processes have two stages: first wort run-off, during which the extract is separated in an undiluted state from the spent grains, and sparging, in which extract which remains with the grains is rinsed off with hot water. The lauter tun is a tank with holes in the bottom small enough to hold back the large bits of grist and hulls (the ground or milled cereal). The bed of grist that settles on it is the actual filter. Some lauter tuns have provision for rotating rakes or knives to cut into the bed of grist to maintain good flow. The knives can be turned so they push the grain, a feature used to drive the spent grain out of the vessel. The mash filter is a plate-and-frame filter. The empty frames contain the mash, including the spent grains, and have a capacity of around one hectoliter. The plates contain a support structure for the filter cloth. The plates, frames, and filter cloths are arranged in a carrier frame like so: frame, cloth, plate, cloth, with plates at each end of the structure. Newer mash filters have bladders that can press the liquid out of the grains between spargings. The grain does not act like a filtration medium in a mash filter.

Boiling

After mashing, the beer wort is boiled with hops (and other flavourings if used) in a large tank known as a "copper" or brew kettle – though historically the mash vessel was used and is still in some small breweries. The boiling process is where chemical reactions take place, including sterilization of the wort to remove unwanted bacteria, releasing of hop flavours, bitterness and aroma compounds through isomerization, stopping of enzymatic processes, precipitation of proteins, and concentration of the wort. Finally, the vapours produced during the boil volatilise off-flavours, including dimethyl sulfide precursors. The boil is conducted so that it is even and intense – a continuous "rolling boil". The boil on average lasts between 45 and 90 minutes, depending on its intensity, the hop addition schedule, and volume of water the brewer expects to evaporate. At the end of the boil, solid particles in the hopped wort are separated out, usually in a vessel called a "whirlpool".

Brew kettle or copper

Copper is the traditional material for the boiling vessel for two main reasons: firstly because copper transfers heat quickly and evenly; secondly because the bubbles produced during boiling, which could act as an insulator against the heat, do not cling to the surface of copper, so the wort is heated in a consistent manner. The simplest boil kettles are direct-fired, with a burner underneath. These can produce a vigorous and favourable boil, but are also apt to scorch the wort where the flame touches the kettle, causing caramelisation and making cleanup difficult. Most breweries use a steam-fired kettle, which uses steam jackets in the kettle to boil the wort. Breweries usually have a boiling unit either inside or outside of the kettle, usually a tall, thin cylinder with vertical tubes, called a calandria, through which wort is pumped.

Whirlpool

At the end of the boil, solid particles in the hopped wort are separated out, usually in a vessel called a "whirlpool" or "settling tank". The whirlpool was devised by Henry Ranulph Hudston while working for the Molson Brewery in 1960 to utilise the so-called tea leaf paradox to force the denser solids known as "trub" (coagulated proteins, vegetable matter from hops) into a cone in the centre of the whirlpool tank. Whirlpool systems vary: smaller breweries tend to use the brew kettle, larger breweries use a separate tank, and design will differ, with tank floors either flat, sloped, conical or with a cup in the centre. The principle in all is that by swirling the wort the centripetal force will push the trub into a cone at the centre of the bottom of the tank, where it can be easily removed.

Hopback

A hopback is a traditional additional chamber that acts as a sieve or filter by using whole hops to clear debris (or "trub") from the unfermented (or "green") wort, as the whirlpool does, and also to increase hop aroma in the finished beer. It is a chamber between the brewing kettle and wort chiller. Hops are added to the chamber, the hot wort from the kettle is run through it, and then immediately cooled in the wort chiller before entering the fermentation chamber. Hopbacks utilizing a sealed chamber facilitate maximum retention of volatile hop aroma compounds that would normally be driven off when the hops contact the hot wort. While a hopback has a similar filtering effect as a whirlpool, it operates differently: a whirlpool uses centrifugal forces, a hopback uses a layer of whole hops to act as a filter bed. Furthermore, while a whirlpool is useful only for the removal of pelleted hops (as flowers do not tend to separate as easily), in general hopbacks are used only for the removal of whole flower hops (as the particles left by pellets tend to make it through the hopback). The hopback has mainly been substituted in modern breweries by the whirlpool.

Wort cooling

After the whirlpool, the wort must be brought down to fermentation temperatures  before yeast is added. In modern breweries this is achieved through a plate heat exchanger. A plate heat exchanger has many ridged plates, which form two separate paths. The wort is pumped into the heat exchanger, and goes through every other gap between the plates. The cooling medium, usually water, goes through the other gaps. The ridges in the plates ensure turbulent flow. After cooling, oxygen is often dissolved into the wort to revitalize the yeast and aid its reproduction. Some of the craft brewery, particularly those wanting to create steam beer, utilize coolship instead.

While boiling, it is useful to recover some of the energy used to boil the wort. On its way out of the brewery, the steam created during the boil is passed over a coil through which unheated water flows. By adjusting the rate of flow, the output temperature of the water can be controlled. This is also often done using a plate heat exchanger. The water is then stored for later use in the next mash, in equipment cleaning, or wherever necessary. Another common method of energy recovery takes place during the wort cooling. When cold water is used to cool the wort in a heat exchanger, the water is significantly warmed. In an efficient brewery, cold water is passed through the heat exchanger at a rate set to maximize the water's temperature upon exiting. This now-hot water is then stored in a hot water tank.

Fermenting 

Fermentation takes place in fermentation vessels which come in various forms, from enormous cylindroconical vessels, through open stone vessels, to wooden vats. After the wort is cooled and aerated – usually with sterile air – yeast is added to it, and it begins to ferment. It is during this stage that sugars won from the malt are converted into alcohol and carbon dioxide, and the product can be called beer for the first time.

Most breweries today use cylindroconical vessels, or CCVs, which have a conical bottom and a cylindrical top. The cone's angle is typically around 60°, an angle that will allow the yeast to flow towards the cone's apex, but is not so steep as to take up too much vertical space. CCVs can handle both fermenting and conditioning in the same tank. At the end of fermentation, the yeast and other solids which have fallen to the cone's apex can be simply flushed out of a port at the apex. Open fermentation vessels are also used, often for show in brewpubs, and in Europe in wheat beer fermentation. These vessels have no tops, which makes harvesting top-fermenting yeasts very easy. The open tops of the vessels make the risk of infection greater, but with proper cleaning procedures and careful protocol about who enters fermentation chambers, the risk can be well controlled. Fermentation tanks are typically made of stainless steel. If they are simple cylindrical tanks with beveled ends, they are arranged vertically, as opposed to conditioning tanks which are usually laid out horizontally. Only a very few breweries still use wooden vats for fermentation as wood is difficult to keep clean and infection-free and must be repitched more or less yearly.

Fermentation methods

There are three main fermentation methods, warm, cool, and wild or spontaneous. Fermentation may take place in open or closed vessels. There may be a secondary fermentation which can take place in the brewery, in the cask or in the bottle.

Brewing yeasts are traditionally classed as "top-cropping" (or "top-fermenting") and "bottom-cropping" (or "bottom-fermenting"); the yeasts classed as top-fermenting are generally used in warm fermentations, where they ferment quickly, and the yeasts classed as bottom-fermenting are used in cooler fermentations where they ferment more slowly. Yeast were termed top or bottom cropping, because the yeast was collected from the top or bottom of the fermenting wort to be reused for the next brew. This terminology is somewhat inappropriate in the modern era; after the widespread application of brewing mycology it was discovered that the two separate collecting methods involved two different yeast species that favoured different temperature regimes, namely Saccharomyces cerevisiae in top-cropping at warmer temperatures and Saccharomyces pastorianus in bottom-cropping at cooler temperatures. As brewing methods changed in the 20th century, cylindro-conical fermenting vessels became the norm and the collection of yeast for both Saccharomyces species is done from the bottom of the fermenter. Thus the method of collection no longer implies a species association. There are a few remaining breweries who collect yeast in the top-cropping method, such as Samuel Smiths brewery in Yorkshire, Marstons in Staffordshire and several German hefeweizen producers.

For both types, yeast is fully distributed through the beer while it is fermenting, and both equally flocculate (clump together and precipitate to the bottom of the vessel) when fermentation is finished. By no means do all top-cropping yeasts demonstrate this behaviour, but it features strongly in many English yeasts that may also exhibit chain forming (the failure of budded cells to break from the mother cell), which is in the technical sense different from true flocculation. The most common top-cropping brewer's yeast, Saccharomyces cerevisiae, is the same species as the common baking yeast. However, baking and brewing yeasts typically belong to different strains, cultivated to favour different characteristics: baking yeast strains are more aggressive, in order to carbonate dough in the shortest amount of time; brewing yeast strains act slower, but tend to tolerate higher alcohol concentrations (normally 12–15% abv is the maximum, though under special treatment some ethanol-tolerant strains can be coaxed up to around 20%). Modern quantitative genomics has revealed the complexity of Saccharomyces species to the extent that yeasts involved in beer and wine production commonly involve hybrids of so-called pure species. As such, the yeasts involved in what has been typically called top-cropping or top-fermenting ale may be both Saccharomyces cerevisiae and complex hybrids of Saccharomyces cerevisiae and Saccharomyces kudriavzevii. Three notable ales, Chimay, Orval and Westmalle, are fermented with these hybrid strains, which are identical to wine yeasts from Switzerland.

Warm fermentation

They generally form a foam on the surface of the fermenting beer, which is called barm, as during the fermentation process its hydrophobic surface causes the flocs to adhere to CO2 and rise; because of this, they are often referred to as "top-cropping" or "top-fermenting" – though this distinction is less clear in modern brewing with the use of cylindro-conical tanks. Generally, warm-fermented beers, which are usually termed ale, are ready to drink within three weeks after the beginning of fermentation, although some brewers will condition or mature them for several months.

Cool fermentation

During the lagering or storage phase several flavour components developed during fermentation dissipate, resulting in a "cleaner" flavour. Though it is the slow, cool fermentation and cold conditioning (or lagering) that defines the character of lager, the main technical difference is with the yeast generally used, which is Saccharomyces pastorianus. Technical differences include the ability of lager yeast to metabolize melibiose, and the tendency to settle at the bottom of the fermenter (though ales yeasts can also become bottom settling by selection); though these technical differences are not considered by scientists to be influential in the character or flavour of the finished beer, brewers feel otherwise - sometimes cultivating their own yeast strains which may suit their brewing equipment or for a particular purpose, such as brewing beers with a high abv.

Brewers in Bavaria had for centuries been selecting cold-fermenting yeasts by storing ("lagern") their beers in cold alpine caves. The process of natural selection meant that the wild yeasts that were most cold tolerant would be the ones that would remain actively fermenting 
in the beer that was stored in the caves. A sample of these Bavarian yeasts was sent from the Spaten brewery in Munich to the Carlsberg brewery in Copenhagen in 1845 who began brewing with it. In 1883 Emile Hansen completed a study on pure yeast culture isolation and the pure strain obtained from Spaten went into industrial production in 1884 as Carlsberg yeast No 1. Another specialized pure yeast production plant was installed at the Heineken Brewery in Rotterdam the following year and together they began the supply of pure cultured yeast to brewers across Europe. This yeast strain was originally classified as Saccharomyces carlsbergensis, a now defunct species name which has been superseded by the currently accepted taxonomic classification Saccharomyces pastorianus.

Spontaneous fermentation
Lambic beers are historically brewed in Brussels and the nearby Pajottenland region of Belgium without any yeast inoculation. The wort is cooled in open vats (called "coolships"), where the yeasts and microbiota present in the brewery (such as Brettanomyces) are allowed to settle to create a spontaneous fermentation, and are then conditioned or matured in oak barrels for typically one to three years.

Conditioning

After an initial or primary fermentation, beer is conditioned, matured or aged, in one of several ways, which can take from 2 to 4 weeks, several months, or several years, depending on the brewer's intention for the beer. The beer is usually transferred into a second container, so that it is no longer exposed to the dead yeast and other debris (also known as "trub") that have settled to the bottom of the primary fermenter. This prevents the formation of unwanted flavours and harmful compounds such as acetaldehyde.

Kräusening
Kräusening is a conditioning method in which fermenting wort is added to the finished beer. The active yeast will restart fermentation in the finished beer, and so introduce fresh carbon dioxide; the conditioning tank will be then sealed so that the carbon dioxide is dissolved into the beer producing a lively "condition" or level of carbonation. The kräusening method may also be used to condition bottled beer.

Lagering
Lagers are stored at cellar temperature or below for 1–6 months while still on the yeast. The process of storing, or conditioning, or maturing, or aging a beer at a low temperature for a long period is called "lagering", and while it is associated with lagers, the process may also be done with ales, with the same result – that of cleaning up various chemicals, acids and compounds.

Secondary fermentation
During secondary fermentation, most of the remaining yeast will settle to the bottom of the second fermenter, yielding a less hazy product.

Bottle fermentation
Some beers undergo an additional fermentation in the bottle giving natural carbonation. This may be a second and/or third fermentation. They are bottled with a viable yeast population in suspension. If there is no residual fermentable sugar left, sugar or wort or both may be added in a process known as priming. The resulting fermentation generates CO2 that is trapped in the bottle, remaining in solution and providing natural carbonation. Bottle-conditioned beers may be either filled unfiltered direct from the fermentation or conditioning tank, or filtered and then reseeded with yeast.

Cask conditioning

Cask ale (or cask-conditioned beer) is unfiltered, unpasteurised beer that is conditioned by a secondary fermentation in a metal, plastic or wooden cask. It is dispensed from the cask by being either poured from a tap by gravity, or pumped up from a cellar via a beer engine (hand pump). Sometimes a cask breather is used to keep the beer fresh by allowing carbon dioxide to replace oxygen as the beer is drawn off the cask. Until 2018, the Campaign for Real Ale (CAMRA) defined real ale as beer "served without the use of extraneous carbon dioxide", which would disallow the use of a cask breather, a policy which was reversed in April 2018 to allow beer served with the use of cask breathers to meet its definition of real ale.

Barrel-ageing

Barrel-ageing (US: Barrel aging) is the process of ageing beer in wooden barrels to achieve a variety of effects in the final product. Sour beers such as lambics are fully fermented in wood, while other beers are aged in barrels which were previously used for maturing wines or spirits. In 2016 "Craft Beer and Brewing" wrote: "Barrel-aged beers are so trendy that nearly every taphouse and beer store has a section of them.

Filtering

Filtering stabilises the flavour of beer, holding it at a point acceptable to the brewer, and preventing further development from the yeast, which under poor conditions can release negative components and flavours. Filtering also removes haze, clearing the beer, and so giving it a "polished shine and brilliance". Beer with a clear appearance has been commercially desirable for brewers since the development of glass vessels for storing and drinking beer, along with the commercial success of pale lager, which - due to the lagering process in which haze and particles settle to the bottom of the tank and so the beer "drops bright" (clears) - has a natural bright appearance and shine. 

There are several forms of filters; they may be in the form of sheets or "candles", or they may be a fine powder such as diatomaceous earth (also called kieselguhr), which is added to the beer to form a filtration bed which allows liquid to pass, but holds onto suspended particles such as yeast. Filters range from rough filters that remove much of the yeast and any solids (e.g., hops, grain particles) left in the beer, to filters tight enough to strain colour and body from the beer. Filtration ratings are divided into rough, fine, and sterile. Rough filtration leaves some cloudiness in the beer, but it is noticeably clearer than unfiltered beer. Fine filtration removes almost all cloudiness. Sterile filtration removes almost all microorganisms.

Sheet (pad) filters
These filters use sheets that allow only particles smaller than a given size to pass through. The sheets are placed into a filtering frame, sanitized (with boiling water, for example) and then used to filter the beer. The sheets can be flushed if the filter becomes blocked. The sheets are usually disposable and are replaced between filtration sessions. Often the sheets contain powdered filtration media to aid in filtration.

Pre-made filters have two sides. One with loose holes, and the other with tight holes. Flow goes from the side with loose holes to the side with the tight holes, with the intent that large particles get stuck in the large holes while leaving enough room around the particles and filter medium for smaller particles to go through and get stuck in tighter holes.

Sheets are sold in nominal ratings, and typically 90% of particles larger than the nominal rating are caught by the sheet.
Kieselguhr filters

Filters that use a powder medium are considerably more complicated to operate, but can filter much more beer before regeneration. Common media include diatomaceous earth and perlite.

By-products

Brewing by-products are "spent grain" and the sediment (or "dregs") from the filtration process which may be dried and resold as "brewers dried yeast" for poultry feed, or made into yeast extract which is used in brands such as Vegemite and Marmite. The process of turning the yeast sediment into edible yeast extract was discovered by German scientist Justus von Liebig.

Brewer's spent grain (also called spent grain, brewer's grain or draff) is the main by-product of the brewing process; it consists of the residue of malt and grain which remains in the lauter tun after the lautering process. It consists primarily of grain husks, pericarp, and fragments of endosperm. As it mainly consists of carbohydrates and proteins, and is readily consumed by animals, spent grain is used in animal feed. Spent grains can also be used as fertilizer, whole grains in bread, as well as in the production of flour and biogas. Spent grain is also an ideal medium for growing mushrooms, such as shiitake, and already some breweries are either growing their own mushrooms or supplying spent grain to mushroom farms. Spent grains can be used in the production of red bricks, to improve the open porosity and reduce thermal conductivity of the ceramic mass.

Brewing industry

The brewing industry is a global business, consisting of several dominant multinational companies and many thousands of other producers known as microbreweries or regional breweries or craft breweries depending on size, region, and marketing preference. SABMiller became the largest brewing company in the world when it acquired Royal Grolsch, brewer of Dutch premium beer brand Grolsch. InBev was the second-largest beer-producing company in the world and Anheuser-Busch held the third spot, but after the acquisition of Anheuser-Busch by InBev, the new Anheuser-Busch InBev company is currently the largest brewer in the world.

Brewing at home is subject to regulation and prohibition in many countries. Restrictions on homebrewing were lifted in the UK in 1963, Australia followed suit in 1972, and the US in 1978, though individual states were allowed to pass their own laws limiting production.

References

Sources
 Bamforth, Charles; Food, Fermentation and Micro-organisms, Wiley-Blackwell, 2005, 
 Bamforth, Charles; Beer: Tap into the Art and Science of Brewing, Oxford University Press, 2009
 Boulton, Christopher; Encyclopaedia of Brewing, Wiley-Blackwell, 2013, 
 Briggs, Dennis E., et al.; Malting and Brewing Science, Aspen Publishers, 1982, 
 Ensminger, Audrey; Foods & Nutrition Encyclopedia, CRC Press, 1994, 
 Esslinger, Hans Michael; Handbook of Brewing: Processes, Technology, Markets, Wiley-VCH, 2009, 
 Hornsey, Ian Spencer; Brewing, Royal Society of Chemistry, 1999, 
 Hui, Yiu H.; Food Biotechnology, Wiley-IEEE, 1994, 
 Hui, Yiu H., and Smith, J. Scott; Food Processing: Principles and Applications, Wiley-Blackwell, 2004, 
 Andrew G.H. Lea, John Raymond Piggott, John R. Piggott ; Fermented Beverage Production, Kluwer Academic/Plenum Publishers, 2003, 
 McFarland, Ben; World's Best Beers, Sterling Publishing, 2009, 
 Oliver, Garrett (ed); The Oxford Companion to Beer, Oxford University Press, 2011
 Priest, Fergus G.; Handbook of Brewing, CRC Press, 2006, 
 
 Stevens, Roger, et al.; Brewing: Science and Practice, Woodhead Publishing, 2004, 
 Unger, Richard W.; Beer in the Middle Ages and the Renaissance, University of Pennsylvania Press, 2004,

External links

 An overview of the microbiology behind beer brewing from the Science Creative Quarterly
 A pictorial overview of the brewing process at the Heriot-Watt University Pilot Brewery

 
Fermentation in food processing